This is the discography of DJ Quik, an American hip-hop artist and Record producer. This list includes all of the official album and single releases, including his albums, Quik Is the Name, which debuted at No. 29 on the US Billboard 200 chart, and No. 9 on the Top R&B/Hip-Hop Albums in 1991. Way 2 Fonky, which debuted at No. 10 on the US Billboard 200 chart, and No. 13 on the Top R&B/Hip-Hop Albums in 1992. Safe + Sound, which debuted at No. 14 on the US Billboard 200 chart, and No. 1 on the Top R&B/Hip-Hop Albums in 1995. Rhythm-al-ism, which debuted at No. 63 on the US Billboard 200 chart, and No. 13 on the Top R&B/Hip-Hop Albums in 1995. Balance & Options, which was his first album not to chart and not to receive a RIAA certification in 2000. Under tha Influence, which debuted at No. 27 on the US Billboard 200 chart, and No. 7 on the Top R&B/Hip-Hop Albums in 2002. Trauma, which debuted at No. 43 on the US Billboard 200 chart, No. 13 on the Top R&B/Hip-Hop Albums, No. 9 on the Rap Albums, and No. 1 on the Independent Albums in 2005.

Albums

Studio albums

Collaborative albums

Compilation albums

Live albums

Instrumental albums

Extended plays

Mixtapes
1987: The Red Tape
2005: The Trauma Mixtape
2011: The Audio Biography of David

Singles

As lead artist

As featured artist

Guest appearances

Music videos

As lead artist

Collaboration videos

Featured music videos

Cameo appearances
1991: "Be True To Yourself" by 2nd II None
1991: "Leave My Curl Alone" by Hi-C
1994: "Bringin' The Funk" by STR8-G
1996: "California Love (RMX)" by 2Pac feat. Dr. Dre and Roger Troutman
1997: "If U Stay Ready" by Suga Free feat. Playa Hamm
1998: "The Way It's Goin' Down" by Shaquille O'Neal feat. Peter Gunz
2001: "Get Your Walk On" by Xzibit
2001: "Nothing's Wrong" by Won G. feat. James DeBarge
2002: "Addictive" by Truth Hurts feat. Rakim
2004: "How We Do" by The Game feat. 50 Cent
2006: "Cali Iz Active" by Tha Dogg Pound feat. Snoop Dogg
2007: "Lift Me Up" by Jay Rock
2009: "Pronto" by Snoop Dogg feat. Soulja Boy
2010: "And U Do Know That" by Mac Shawn
2010: "Rocketeer" by Far East Movement feat. Ryan Tedder
2010: "New Year's Eve" by Snoop Dogg feat. Marty James
2010: "On Point" by Strong Arm Steady feat. Too Short
2010: "Tell A Friend 2 Tell A Friend" by Mann
2011: "That's How I Roll Up" by Flesh-n-Bone
2012: "Way Too Gone" by Young Jeezy feat. Future

References 

DJ Quik
Discographies of American artists